Agris Kazeļņiks (born 24 July 1973) is a strongman competitor from Ogre, Latvia. Agris is a 3 time Latvia's Strongest Man and frequent competitor in the Strongman Champions League. Agris finished 3rd overall in the 2008 season of Strongman Champions League, and 2nd place overall in the 2009 season.

References

Latvian strength athletes
1973 births
Living people